Major General Sir John Carstairs McNeill  (28 March 1831 – 25 May 1904) was a senior British Army officer and Scottish recipient of the Victoria Cross (VC), the highest award for gallantry in the face of the enemy that can be awarded to British and Commonwealth forces.

Life
McNeill was the son of Anne Elizabeth McNeill née Carstairs, and Alexander McNeill (1791–1850), brother of Duncan McNeill, Lord Colonsay and Sir John McNeill. His brother was Alexander McNeill. He was educated at the University of St Andrews and Addiscombe Military Seminary.

On 18 June 1850, he and Alexander survived the wreck of the Orion, in which their parents and two sisters lost their lives.

McNeill entered the Bengal Army in December 1850 as an Ensign in the 12th Bengal Native Infantry. During the Indian Mutiny, he served at the siege and capture of Lucknow, after which he gained the brevet of major. In 1861 he transferred to the 107th Regiment of Foot (Bengal Light Infantry) – later The Royal Sussex Regiment. Shortly afterwards he travelled to New Zealand as a staff officer, and was promoted brevet lieutenant-colonel in March 1864.

VC action
McNeill was 33 years old, and a lieutenant colonel in the 107th Regiment of Foot (Bengal Light Infantry), while serving as an  Aide-de-Camp to Lieutenant General Sir Duncan Cameron during the Invasion of Waikato (a campaign of the New Zealand Wars), when the following deed took place for which he was awarded the VC.

Later career
From 1869 to 1872 McNeill was military secretary to Lord Lisgar, Governor General of Canada, and was on the staff of the 1870 Red River expedition under Sir Garnet Wolseley. He became a colonel in 1872 and served as Wolseley's chief of staff in the Second Ashanti War (1873–4), where he was wounded and invalided home. He was made a Companion of the Order of the Bath (CB) in March 1874, by which time he had also been appointed aide-de-camp to the commander-in-chief, the Duke of Cambridge. Establishing a close connection with the Royal Family, he was appointed equerry to Queen Victoria in November 1874, and accompanied the Queen's son, Prince Leopold, to Canada – becoming a Knight Commander of the Order of St Michael and St George (KCMG) in 1880.

He served in the 1882 Egyptian campaign, after which he was promoted to major-general, and made a Knight Commander of the Order of the Bath (KCB) in November 1882. Leading a brigade during the 1885 Suakin Expedition, he was in command at the Battle of Tofrek on 22 March, against Mahdist forces led by Osman Digna. The Mahdists attacked in force and, although they were finally driven off with heavy losses, McNeill was initially accused of being taken by surprise by the attack, while his superior, Lieutenant-General Sir Gerald Graham, was criticised for not giving him sufficient mounted troops. While Wolseley's report largely exonerated McNeill, this was his last command in the field. He retired from the army in 1890.

His association with the royal household continued, and he accompanied the Queen's son Prince Arthur on his world tour in 1890. In 1898 McNeill was appointed king of arms to the Order of the Bath and was made a Knight Grand Cross of the Royal Victorian Order (GCVO) in 1901, on the accession of Edward VII. He died, unmarried, on 25 May 1904 at St James's Palace, London, and was buried at Oronsay Priory, Argyll.

Honours
British honours
VC: Victoria Cross – 1864
GCVO: Knight Grand Cross of the Royal Victorian Order
KCB: Knight Commander of the Order of the Bath
KCMG: Knight Commander of the Order of St Michael and St George
Foreign honours
: 2nd class of the Order of the Medjidie (Ottoman Empire) – 1882.
: Knight 1st class of the Order of the Crown – 1899 – in connection with the visit of Emperor Wilhelm II to the United Kingdom.

McNeill's medals, including his VC, are part of the Lord Ashcroft Gallery held at the Imperial War Museum, London.

References

External links
Location of grave and VC medal in Strathclyde
Profile from Eastbourne Museums

People from Argyll and Bute
1831 births
1904 deaths
British military personnel of the Indian Rebellion of 1857
British military personnel of the New Zealand Wars
New Zealand Wars recipients of the Victoria Cross
People of the Fenian raids
People of the Red River Rebellion
British military personnel of the Third Anglo-Ashanti War
British Army personnel of the Anglo-Egyptian War
British Army generals
British recipients of the Victoria Cross
Knights Grand Cross of the Royal Victorian Order
Knights Commander of the Order of the Bath
Knights Commander of the Order of St Michael and St George
Equerries
Royal Sussex Regiment officers
British East India Company Army officers
British Army recipients of the Victoria Cross
Graduates of Addiscombe Military Seminary